Okkert Brits (born 22 August 1973, in Uitenhage) is a former South African track and field athlete who specialised in the pole vault. He was the silver medallist at the World Championships in Athletics in 2003. He was a four-time champion at the African Championships in Athletics and twice champion at the All-Africa Games. He was a gold medallist at the 2002 Commonwealth Games and took bronze at the 1995 IAAF World Indoor Championships.

His personal best of 6.03 m, set in 1995, is the African record. This made him the first African in the 6 metres club of vaulters. He competed in the 1996, 2000 and 2004 Olympic Games finishing seventh in 2000. He ranked number one in the world for the 1995 season.

He has been married to Jane Gillespie since 2003; they are the parents of Sarah Jane Brits (born in 2005) and David Okkert Brits (born in 2006). In 2009, Brits took part in the 3rd season of Survivor: South Africa, placing eighth.

In January 2003, Brits tested positive for a banned substance ephedrine, which he claimed must have been in the energy supplement he took. For its being his first offence and ephedrine only being a stimulant, he was only given a public warning.

Competition record

Survivor South Africa: Santa Carolina
In 2010, Brits competed on the third season of Survivor South Africa, Survivor South Africa: Santa Carolina. He made the merge, and ultimately was voted out in 8th place. He cast his jury vote for Perle "GiGi" van Schalkwyk, who ultimately won the competition.

See also
 List of champions of Africa of athletics
 List of doping cases in athletics

References

External links
 
 
 

1973 births
Living people
People from Uitenhage
Afrikaner people
South African male pole vaulters
Olympic athletes of South Africa
Athletes (track and field) at the 1996 Summer Olympics
Athletes (track and field) at the 2000 Summer Olympics
Athletes (track and field) at the 2004 Summer Olympics
Commonwealth Games gold medallists for South Africa
Commonwealth Games medallists in athletics
Athletes (track and field) at the 1994 Commonwealth Games
Athletes (track and field) at the 2002 Commonwealth Games
World Athletics Championships athletes for South Africa
World Athletics Championships medalists
Doping cases in athletics
South African sportspeople in doping cases
African Games gold medalists for South Africa
African Games medalists in athletics (track and field)
Athletes (track and field) at the 1995 All-Africa Games
Athletes (track and field) at the 1999 All-Africa Games
Sportspeople from the Eastern Cape
Medallists at the 2002 Commonwealth Games